Andrew Jackson Barchfeld (May 18, 1863 – January 28, 1922) was a Republican member of the United States House of Representatives from Pennsylvania.

Barchfeld was born in Pittsburgh, Pennsylvania, to German immigrants from Prussia.  He attended Pittsburgh Central High School and graduated from Jefferson Medical College in Philadelphia, Pennsylvania, in 1884.  He was a physician, hospital executive, and member of the common council of Pittsburgh from 1886 to 1887.  He was a member of the Republican State committee.  He was an unsuccessful candidate for election to Congress in 1902.

Barchfeld was elected as a Republican to the Fifty-ninth and to the five succeeding Congresses.  He was an unsuccessful candidate for reelection in 1916.  He was a delegate to the peace congress at Brussels in 1905.  He was a member of the commission to the Philippine Islands in 1910, and a member of the Panama Canal Commission in 1912.

Barchfeld died on January 28, 1922, in the collapse of the Knickerbocker Theater in Washington, D.C.  He is buried in South Side Cemetery in Pittsburgh.

Sources

The Political Graveyard

References

1863 births
1922 deaths
Physicians from Pennsylvania
Politicians from Pittsburgh
Thomas Jefferson University alumni
American people of German descent
Accidental deaths in Washington, D.C.
Republican Party members of the United States House of Representatives from Pennsylvania